The William Pitt Eastman House was built in Eastman, Georgia by William Pitt Eastman in 1872.  Eastman was the organizer of the Georgia Land and Lumber Company and the city is named after him. The house is the oldest one in the city and is a well-preserved example of late Victorian architecture. The Dodge County Historical Society now owns the house and tours are available by appointment. The house was added to the National Register of Historic Places on July 7, 1995.

See also
National Register of Historic Places listings in Dodge County, Georgia

References

External links
 Eastman-Bishop-Bullock House historical marker

Houses on the National Register of Historic Places in Georgia (U.S. state)
Italianate architecture in Georgia (U.S. state)
National Register of Historic Places in Dodge County, Georgia
Houses completed in 1912